The Constitution of Zambia was formally adopted in 1991 and amended in 2009 and last amended in 2016.

The Zambian constitution has 20 parts, ranging from the SUPREMACY OF CONSTITUTION to GENERAL PROVISIONS. It begins with a PREAMBLE.  

The Zambian constitution is a set of laws, customs and principal by which the state is acknowledged to be governed. It was amended and assented on by then President Edgar Chagwa Lungu on the 5th of January, 2016. as a result of:  

 Repeal of part III (bill of rights) to include; civil, political, economic, social, cultural, environmental,  further and special rights.  Entrench the supremacy of the constitution, article IV and V of the constitution, the electoral system of the election a President and Members of Parliament, the tenure of office of a president and vacancy in the office of President, the election of a vice-President as a running mate to a presidential candidate, the provisions on the appointment, responsibilities and tenure of Ministers and Provincial Ministers, and the provisions relating to the amendment of the constitution; 

 Revise the provisions relating to the declaration of war, state of public emergency, threatened state of public emergency and national disasters;  

 Revise the provisions on amendment of the constitution; and  

 Provide for matters connected with, or incidental, to the foregoing. The Zambian constitution has 20 parts, ranging from the SUPREMACYY OF CONSTITUTION to GENERAL PROVISIONS. It begins with a PREAMBLE. The full highlight of the twenty parts of the Zambian constitution is as follows;  

1. SUPREMACY OF THE CONSTITUTION  

2. NATIONAL VALUES, PRINCIPALS AND ECONOMIC POLICIES  

3. (REPEALED) 4. CITIZENSHIP 5. REPRESENTATION OF THE PEOPLE  

6. LEGISLATURE  

7. EXECUTIVE  

8. JUDICIARY  

9. GENERAL PRINCIPALS OF DEVOLVED GOVERNANCE  

10. PROVINCES, DISTRICTS, WARDS AND PROVINCIAL ADMINISTRATION  

11. LOCAL GOVERNMENT  

12. CHIEFTAINCY AND HOUSE OF CHIEFS  

13. PUBLIC SERVICE  

14. PENSION BENEFIT  

15. DEFENCE AND NATIONAL SECURITY  

16. PUBLIC FINANCE AND BUDGET  

17. CENTRAL BANK  

18. SERVICES COMMISSIONS AND OTHER INDEPENDENT OFFICES  

19. LAND, ENVIRONMENT AND NATURAL  

20. GENERAL PROVISIONS 

THE CONSTITUTION OF ZAMBIA (MWANSA CHIBUYE)

References

External links
Constitution of Zambia

Zambia
Politics of Zambia